Sharanya Srinivas (born 3 January 1991) is an Indian vocalist who has notably worked in Tamil films as a playback singer. She is the daughter of prominent singer Srinivas.

Career 
 She then went on to complete her secondary education and chose to make a career in music, expressing interest in becoming a vocalist. Sharanya also subsequently underwent a music production course under Henry Kuruvila after doing the same in another course at A. R. Rahmans KM Music Conservatory.She received positive reviews for her song alongside K. J. Yesudas, with a reviewer from The Hindu noting she had a "sweet voice". Her first song in Tamil as an adult was from Phani Kalyan's album Konjam Koffee Konjam Kaadhal (2012), performing song titled "Adi Thaahira" alongside Sathya Prakash. She then performed in the Tamil version of Raanjhanaa for A. R. Rahman again, singing two Carnatic songs, "Kalaarasiga" and "Kanaave Kanaave", describing the first song as "close to her heart".

Discography

Personal life
She is married to Narayanan Kumar.

References 

Indian women playback singers
Living people
Tamil playback singers
1991 births
21st-century Indian singers
21st-century Indian women singers